Kim Song-yong  (born February 26, 1987, in Tokyo, Japan) is a Zainichi Korean striker who has played for the North Korean national football team.

Club career
Kim made his professional debut for Kyoto Sanga FC on 4 April 2009, coming on as a late substitute in a J1 League match against the Kashima Antlers. He scored his first professional goal against Albirex Niigata on 22 August 2009, ensuring his club emerged as the winners of the match. On 16 January 2013, it was announced that Kim Seng-Yong would be signing with Nakhon Ratchasima of Thailand. On 25 November 2013, Kim signed for I-league debutant Rangdajied United for the remainder of the season. Kim signed for Royal Wahingdoh for the 2014-15 I-League season, where he appeared 19 times and scored 5 times, helping his side finish a remarkable 3rd in the league.

Bengaluru FC
On 3 June 2015, Kim signed for Bengaluru FC on a 1-year deal.

On 24 January Kim scored his first goal for Bengaluru by scoring a brace against Shillong Lajong.

DSK Shivajians
In August 2016, Kim signed for another Pune based franchise club DSK Shivajians for a one-year deal. He scored four goals in thirteen appearances as the team finished on seventh position.

International career
Kim was named as one of the North Korean squad for the 2010 AFC Challenge Cup. He made a full international debut for North Korea on February 19, 2010, in the 2010 AFC Challenge Cup against Kyrgyzstan at Sugathadasa Stadium in Colombo.  He also played in a friendly match against South Africa in April 2010, prior to the 2010 FIFA World Cup.

Personal life
Born and raised in Japan, it was his family connections and pride that made up his mind to choose North Korea, after his ancestors, like many during the time of World War II, chose to stay behind in Japan following the war and came to be known as Zainichi Korean. His father, Kim Kwang-Ho, was the first Zainichi Korean footballer to be called up for the senior Korea DPR national football team.

References

External links

Bengaluru FC Profile

1987 births
Living people
North Korean footballers
Association football forwards
Association football people from Tokyo
Expatriate footballers in Japan
Expatriate footballers in India
J1 League players
J2 League players
Kyoto Sanga FC players
Thespakusatsu Gunma players
Bengaluru FC players
North Korea international footballers
North Korean expatriate footballers
North Korean expatriate sportspeople in India
North Korean expatriate sportspeople in Japan
Zainichi Korean people
DSK Shivajians FC players